Stalked: Someone's Watching (also stylized as Stalked) is an American documentary television series on Investigation Discovery that debuted on January 24, 2011. The series tells the stories of those who have been stalked and is hosted by Michelle Ward. After a seven year hiatus, the series has been renewed for a fourth season and has been retitled Stalked:Followed By Fear.

Premise
The show chronicles numerous cases—four seasons’ worth—of stalkers and their victims. The stories are told through reenactments with actor portrayals which give viewers a better picture of what exactly happened. Woven throughout each episode are interviews with various people involved in each individual case, which break up the monotony of the reenactments. Interviewees range from the victim's family, friends, colleagues, and, of course, the victims themselves. In addition to the interviews of the aforementioned who have experienced the ordeals is Michelle Ward, the host of the show.

The Host
Michelle Ward attended both the University of Colorado and the University of Southern California and has earned a PhD in Psychology with a focus in Clinical Neuroscience and Behavioral Genetics. Being a victim of stalking herself, Michelle Ward has studied predatory criminals and the judicial system for over ten years. 
She has worked in many different areas of study within the span of her continuing career. At the start of her career, she worked studying criminals, of which she separated them into two categories (impulsive-type and predatory-type). The latter would be characteristic of stalkers, which later became Ward's main focus. In addition to her early work and later studies in genetic and biological characteristics of twins, Michelle has published several articles, with the help of her extensive studies and fulfilling career, regarding psychology and complex human behavior. 
During each episode, Ward offers input at various points in the reenactments in order to explain the stalker's behaviors, their patterns, and some theories on stalking at work.

Examples of Episodes
Episodes cover a wide range of stories. In one episode, a police officer named Amy and her husband get married, but not long into their relationship, the husband's behavior changes dramatically. His emotions become a roller coaster, ranging from extreme sadness to rage. He insults her and scolds over every detail. He tries to exert control over every aspect of Amy's life, down to how she styled her hair. Michelle Ward describes these outbursts of the husband as a demonstration of his lack of control. When she leaves, the intense stalking begins.
Another example comes from the story of a woman named Peggy. She was pursuing a career in the medical field and moved to Albuquerque, New Mexico to do so. Once there, Peggy meets a man named Patrick and the two connect instantly.  After only a few weeks, the pace of the relationship picked up greatly at the hand of Patrick, which Michelle Ward identifies as a means of controlling the relationship. Emotional abuse sets in and after three years, Peggy leaves. Patrick, enraged at his loss of control, hunts her down and eventually kills her before taking his own life. 
Another episode offers a more disturbing view of stalking. A woman named Mary moves to a small suburb in Washington D.C. with her family. She meets her neighbor, Jane and soon after, her life falls apart. Jane becomes obsessed with her and imitates her every move. She begins to dress in the same clothes as Mary and dyed her hair to match her new “best friend.” Realizing this, Mary ignores Jane which proves to be dangerous. Jane begins to accuse Mary of anything and everything to cause pain. Michelle Ward comments that many stalkers use the façade of being a victim themselves. Mary and her family are forced to move and the stalking comes to an end.

Media Coverage of Stalking
With the emergence of new technologies, stalking has been made easier via texts, GPS, social networking sites, and more. This type of stalking has been dubbed cyberstalking, and although the use of technology by predators is relatively new, the act of stalking is not a new phenomenon as many people believe. It dates back almost 200 years, seen through artwork, news reports, films, etc. 
With the emergence of technology and social media, stalking does receive more extensive coverage by media outlets; therefore, the topic has been made more familiar to the public. One famous case of celebrity stalking occurred when a woman named Genevieve Sabourin was arrested for stalking Alec Baldwin. Like the many stories depicted in Stalked, Sabourin waited at Baldwin's house, called him excessively, and made it seem as though the two were lovers. 
Another recent example involving non-celebrities which made headlines involved a man named James Jones was arrested for stalking his former professor at Alabama College. Jones went to extreme means, and his stalking led to aggravated assault. He opened fire on the woman's house but she remained unharmed.

Episodes

Season 1 (2011)

Season 2 (2011-2012)

Season 3 (2012-2013)

Season 4 (2013-2014)

References

2010s American documentary television series
2011 American television series debuts
English-language television shows
Investigation Discovery original programming
Works about stalking
2014 American television series endings